In mathematics, the Fibonacci sequence is a sequence in which each number is the sum of the two preceding ones. Individual numbers in the Fibonacci sequence are known as Fibonacci numbers, commonly denoted . The sequence commonly starts from 0 and 1, although some authors start the sequence from 1 and 1 or sometimes (as did Fibonacci) from 1 and 2. Starting from 0 and 1, the first few values in the sequence are:

0, 1, 1, 2, 3, 5, 8, 13, 21, 34, 55, 89, 144.

The Fibonacci numbers were first described in Indian mathematics, as early as 200 BC in work by Pingala on enumerating possible patterns of Sanskrit poetry formed from syllables of two lengths. They are named after the Italian mathematician Leonardo of Pisa, later known as Fibonacci, who introduced the sequence to Western European mathematics in his 1202 book Liber Abaci.

Fibonacci numbers appear unexpectedly often in mathematics, so much so that there is an entire journal dedicated to their study, the Fibonacci Quarterly. Applications of Fibonacci numbers include computer algorithms such as the Fibonacci search technique and the Fibonacci heap data structure, and graphs called Fibonacci cubes used for interconnecting parallel and distributed systems. They also appear in biological settings, such as branching in trees, the arrangement of leaves on a stem, the fruit sprouts of a pineapple, the flowering of an artichoke, an uncurling fern, and the arrangement of a pine cone's bracts.

Fibonacci numbers are also closely related to Lucas numbers, which obey the same recurrence relation and with the Fibonacci numbers form a complementary pair of Lucas sequences.

Definition

The Fibonacci numbers may be defined by the recurrence relation

and

The first 20 Fibonacci numbers  are:
{| class="wikitable" style="text-align:right"
|-
| F0
| F1
| F2
| F3
| F4
| F5
| F6
| F7
| F8
| F9
| F10
| F11
| F12
| F13
| F14
| F15
| F16
| F17
| F18
| F19
|-
| 0
| 1
| 1
| 2
| 3
| 5
| 8
| 13
| 21
| 34
| 55
| 89
| 144
| 233
| 377
| 610
| 987
| 1597
| 2584
| 4181
|}

History

India

The Fibonacci sequence appears in Indian mathematics, in connection with Sanskrit prosody. In the Sanskrit poetic tradition, there was interest in enumerating all patterns of long (L) syllables of 2 units duration, juxtaposed with short (S) syllables of 1 unit duration.

Knowledge of the Fibonacci sequence was expressed as early as Pingala ( 450 BC–200 BC). Singh cites Pingala's cryptic formula misrau cha ("the two are mixed") and scholars who interpret it in context as saying that the number of patterns for  beats is obtained by adding one [S] to the  cases and one [L] to the  cases. Bharata Muni also expresses knowledge of the sequence in the Natya Shastra (c. 100 BC–c. 350 AD).
However, the clearest exposition of the sequence arises in the work of Virahanka (c. 700 AD), whose own work is lost, but is available in a quotation by Gopala (c. 1135):

Variations of two earlier meters [is the variation]...  For example, for [a meter of length] four, variations of meters of two [and] three being mixed, five happens. [works out examples 8, 13, 21]... In this way, the process should be followed in all mātrā-vṛttas [prosodic combinations].

Hemachandra (c. 1150) is credited with knowledge of the sequence as well, writing that "the sum of the last and the one before the last is the number ... of the next mātrā-vṛtta."

Europe

The Fibonacci sequence first appears in the book Liber Abaci (The Book of Calculation, 1202) by Fibonacci where it is used to calculate the growth of rabbit populations. Fibonacci considers the growth of an idealized (biologically unrealistic) rabbit population, assuming that: a newly born breeding pair of rabbits are put in a field; each breeding pair mates at the age of one month, and at the end of their second month they always produce another pair of rabbits; and rabbits never die, but continue breeding forever. Fibonacci posed the puzzle: how many pairs will there be in one year?

 At the end of the first month, they mate, but there is still only 1 pair.
 At the end of the second month they produce a new pair, so there are 2 pairs in the field.
 At the end of the third month, the original pair produce a second pair, but the second pair only mate to gestate for a month, so there are 3 pairs in all.
 At the end of the fourth month, the original pair has produced yet another new pair, and the pair born two months ago also produces their first pair, making 5 pairs.

At the end of the th month, the number of pairs of rabbits is equal to the number of mature pairs (that is, the number of pairs in month ) plus the number of pairs alive last month (month ).  The number in the th month is the th Fibonacci number.

The name "Fibonacci sequence" was first used by the 19th-century number theorist Édouard Lucas.

Relation to the golden ratio

Closed-form expression 
Like every sequence defined by a linear recurrence with constant coefficients, the Fibonacci numbers have a closed-form expression. It has become known as Binet's formula, named after French mathematician Jacques Philippe Marie Binet, though it was already known by Abraham de Moivre and Daniel Bernoulli:

where

Since , this formula can also be written as

In other words,
  and  

satisfies the same recurrence.

This is the same as requiring  and  satisfy the system of equations:

which has solution

producing the required formula.

where

Computation by rounding 
Since

Therefore, it can be found by rounding, using the nearest integer function:

Fibonacci numbers can also be computed by truncation, in terms of the floor function:

As the floor function is monotonic, the latter formula can be inverted for finding the index  of the smallest Fibonacci number that is not less than a positive integer :

Magnitude 
As a consequence, for every integer d > 1 there are either 4 or 5 Fibonacci numbers with d decimal digits.

More generally, in the base b representation, the number of digits in Fn is asymptotic to

Limit of consecutive quotients 
Johannes Kepler observed that the ratio of consecutive Fibonacci numbers converges. He wrote that "as 5 is to 8 so is 8 to 13, practically, and as 8 is to 13, so is 13 to 21 almost", and concluded that these ratios approach the golden ratio  

This can be verified using Binet's formula. For example, the initial values 3 and 2 generate the sequence 3, 2, 5, 7, 12, 19, 31, 50, 81, 131, 212, 343, 555, ... . The ratio of consecutive terms in this sequence shows the same convergence towards the golden ratio.

In general, because the ratios between consecutive Fibonacci numbers approaches .

Decomposition of powers 
Since the golden ratio satisfies the equation

The resulting recurrence relationships yield Fibonacci numbers as the linear coefficients:

This equation can be proved by induction on :

For , it is also the case that  and it is also the case that

These expressions are also true for  if the Fibonacci sequence Fn is extended to negative integers using the Fibonacci rule

Identification 

In particular, the left-hand side is a perfect square.

Matrix form 
A 2-dimensional system of linear difference equations that describes the Fibonacci sequence is

alternatively denoted

which yields .

and

As the initial value is

it follows that the th term is

From this, the th element in the Fibonacci series
may be read off directly as a closed-form expression:

Equivalently, the same computation may be performed by diagonalization of  through use of its eigendecomposition:

where  and 
The closed-form expression for the th element in the Fibonacci series is therefore given by

which again yields

The matrix  has a determinant of −1, and thus it is a 2 × 2 unimodular matrix.

This property can be understood in terms of the continued fraction representation for the golden ratio:

The matrix representation gives the following closed-form expression for the Fibonacci numbers:

For a given , this matrix can be computed in  arithmetic operations, using the exponentiation by squaring method.

Taking the determinant of both sides of this equation yields Cassini's identity,

Moreover, since  for any square matrix , the following identities can be derived (they are obtained from two different coefficients of the matrix product, and one may easily deduce the second one from the first one by changing  into ),

These last two identities provide a way to compute Fibonacci numbers recursively in  arithmetic operations and in time , where  is the time for the multiplication of two numbers of  digits. This matches the time for computing the th Fibonacci number from the closed-form matrix formula, but with fewer redundant steps if one avoids recomputing an already computed Fibonacci number (recursion with memoization).

Combinatorial identities

Combinatorial proofs 

In the following,  is the cardinality of a set:

 
 
 
 
 
 

In this manner the recurrence relation

may be understood by dividing the  sequences into two non-overlapping sets where all sequences either begin with 1 or 2:

In a similar manner it may be shown that the sum of the first Fibonacci numbers up to the nth is equal to the (n + 2)nd Fibonacci number minus 1.   In symbols:

This may be seen by dividing all sequences summing to  based on the location of the first 2. Specifically, each set consists of those sequences that start  until the last two sets  each with cardinality 1.

Following the same logic as before, by summing the cardinality of each set we see that
 
... where the last two terms have the value .  From this it follows that .

A similar argument, grouping the sums by the position of the first 1 rather than the first 2 gives two more identities:

and

A different trick may be used to prove

To see this, begin with a Fibonacci rectangle of size  and decompose it into squares of size ; from this the identity follows by comparing areas:

Symbolic method 

The sequence  is also considered using the symbolic method. More precisely, this sequence corresponds to a specifiable combinatorial class. Indeed, as stated above, the -th Fibonacci number equals the number of combinatorial compositions (ordered partitions) of  using terms 1 and 2.

It follows that the ordinary generating function of the Fibonacci sequence, i.e. , is the complex function

Induction proofs 

Fibonacci identities often can be easily proved using mathematical induction.

For example, reconsider

Adding  to both sides gives

and so we have the formula for 

Similarly, add  to both sides of

to give

Binet formula proofs 

The Binet formula is

This can be used to prove Fibonacci identities.

For example, to prove that 
note that the left hand side multiplied by  becomes

Other identities 
Numerous other identities can be derived using various methods. Here are some of them:

Cassini's and Catalan's identities 

Cassini's identity states that

Catalan's identity is a generalization:

d'Ocagne's identity 

where Ln is the n-th Lucas number. The last is an identity for doubling n; other identities of this type are

by Cassini's identity.

These can be found experimentally using lattice reduction, and are useful in setting up the special number field sieve to factorize a Fibonacci number.

More generally,

or alternatively

Putting  in this formula, one gets again the formulas of the end of above section Matrix form.

Generating function 
The generating function of the Fibonacci sequence is the power series

This can be proved by using the Fibonacci recurrence to expand each coefficient in the infinite sum:

Solving the equation

for  results in the closed form.

The partial fraction decomposition is given by

 gives the generating function for the negafibonacci numbers, and  satisfies the functional equation

Reciprocal sums 

Infinite sums over reciprocal Fibonacci numbers can sometimes be evaluated in terms of theta functions. For example, the sum of every odd-indexed reciprocal Fibonacci number can be written as

and the sum of squared reciprocal Fibonacci numbers as

If we add 1 to each Fibonacci number in the first sum, there is also the closed form

and there is a nested sum of squared Fibonacci numbers giving the reciprocal of the golden ratio,

The sum of all even-indexed reciprocal Fibonacci numbers is

with the Lambert series  since 

So the reciprocal Fibonacci constant is

Moreover, this number has been proved irrational by Richard André-Jeannin.

Millin's series gives the identity

which follows from the closed form for its partial sums as N tends to infinity:

Primes and divisibility

Divisibility properties 
Every third number of the sequence is even (a multiple of ) and, more generally, every kth number of the sequence is a multiple of Fk. Thus the Fibonacci sequence is an example of a divisibility sequence. In fact, the Fibonacci sequence satisfies the stronger divisibility property

where  is the greatest common divisor function.

That is,

for every n.

Every prime number p divides a Fibonacci number that can be determined by the value of p modulo 5. If p is congruent to 1 or 4 modulo 5, then p divides Fp−1, and if p is congruent to 2 or 3 modulo 5, then, p divides Fp+1. The remaining case is that p = 5, and in this case p divides Fp.

These cases can be combined into a single, non-piecewise formula, using the Legendre symbol:

Primality testing 
The above formula can be used as a primality test in the sense that if

where the Legendre symbol has been replaced by the Jacobi symbol, then this is evidence that n is a prime, and if it fails to hold, then n is definitely not a prime. If n is composite and satisfies the formula, then n is a Fibonacci pseudoprime.  When m is largesay a 500-bit numberthen we can calculate Fm (mod n) efficiently using the matrix form.  Thus

Here the matrix power Am is calculated using modular exponentiation, which can be adapted to matrices.

Fibonacci primes 

A Fibonacci prime is a Fibonacci number that is prime. The first few are:

 2, 3, 5, 13, 89, 233, 1597, 28657, 514229, ...

Fibonacci primes with thousands of digits have been found, but it is not known whether there are infinitely many.

Fkn is divisible by Fn, so, apart from F4 = 3, any Fibonacci prime must have a prime index. As there are arbitrarily long runs of composite numbers, there are therefore also arbitrarily long runs of composite Fibonacci numbers.

No Fibonacci number greater than F6 = 8 is one greater or one less than a prime number.

The only nontrivial square Fibonacci number is 144.  Attila Pethő proved in 2001 that there is only a finite number of perfect power Fibonacci numbers. In 2006, Y. Bugeaud, M. Mignotte, and S. Siksek proved that 8 and 144 are the only such non-trivial perfect powers.

1, 3, 21, and 55 are the only triangular Fibonacci numbers, which was conjectured by Vern Hoggatt and proved by Luo Ming.

No Fibonacci number can be a perfect number. More generally, no Fibonacci number other than 1 can be multiply perfect, and no ratio of two Fibonacci numbers can be perfect.

Prime divisors 
With the exceptions of 1, 8 and 144 (F1 = F2, F6 and F12) every Fibonacci number has a prime factor that is not a factor of any smaller Fibonacci number (Carmichael's theorem). As a result, 8 and 144 (F6 and F12) are the only Fibonacci numbers that are the product of other Fibonacci numbers.

The divisibility of Fibonacci numbers by a prime p is related to the Legendre symbol  which is evaluated as follows:

If p is a prime number then

For example,

It is not known whether there exists a prime p such that

Such primes (if there are any) would be called Wall–Sun–Sun primes.

Also, if p ≠  5 is an odd prime number then:

Example 1. p = 7, in this case p ≡ 3 (mod 4) and we have:

Example 2. p = 11, in this case p ≡ 3 (mod 4) and we have:

Example 3. p = 13, in this case p ≡ 1 (mod 4) and we have:

Example 4. p = 29, in this case p ≡ 1 (mod 4) and we have:

For odd n, all odd prime divisors of Fn are congruent to 1 modulo 4, implying that all odd divisors of Fn (as the products of odd prime divisors) are congruent to 1 modulo 4.

For example,

All known factors of Fibonacci numbers F(i&hairsp;) for all i < 50000 are collected at the relevant repositories.

Periodicity modulo n 

If the members of the Fibonacci sequence are taken mod n, the resulting sequence is periodic with period at most 6n. The lengths of the periods for various n form the so-called Pisano periods. Determining a general formula for the Pisano periods is an open problem, which includes as a subproblem a special instance of the problem of finding the multiplicative order of a modular integer or of an element in a finite field. However, for any particular n, the Pisano period may be found as an instance of cycle detection.

Generalizations 

The Fibonacci sequence is one of the simplest and earliest known sequences defined by a recurrence relation, and specifically by a linear difference equation. All these sequences may be viewed as generalizations of the Fibonacci sequence. In particular, Binet's formula may be generalized to any sequence that is a solution of a homogeneous linear difference equation with constant coefficients.

Some specific examples that are close, in some sense, to the Fibonacci sequence include:
 Generalizing the index to negative integers to produce the negafibonacci numbers.
 Generalizing the index to real numbers using a modification of Binet's formula.
 Starting with other integers. Lucas numbers have L1 = 1, L2 = 3, and Ln = Ln−1 + Ln−2. Primefree sequences use the Fibonacci recursion with other starting points to generate sequences in which all numbers are composite.
 Letting a number be a linear function (other than the sum) of the 2 preceding numbers. The Pell numbers have Pn = 2Pn−1 + Pn−2.  If the coefficient of the preceding value is assigned a variable value x, the result is the sequence of Fibonacci polynomials.
 Not adding the immediately preceding numbers. The Padovan sequence and Perrin numbers have P(n) = P(n − 2) + P(n − 3).
 Generating the next number by adding 3 numbers (tribonacci numbers), 4 numbers (tetranacci numbers), or more. The resulting sequences are known as n-Step Fibonacci numbers.

Applications

Mathematics 

The Fibonacci numbers occur in the sums of "shallow" diagonals in Pascal's triangle (see Binomial coefficient):

The generating function can be expanded into

To see how the formula is used, we can arrange the sums by the number of terms present:
{|
| 
| 
|-
|
| 
| 
| 
| 
|-
|
| 
| 
| 
|}

These numbers also give the solution to certain enumerative problems, the most common of which is that of counting the number of ways of writing a given number  as an ordered sum of 1s and 2s (called compositions); there are  ways to do this (equivalently, it's also the number of domino tilings of the  rectangle). For example, there are  ways one can climb a staircase of 5 steps, taking one or two steps at a time:
{|
| 
| 
| 
| 
| 
| 
|-
|
| 
| 
| 
|}
The figure shows that 8 can be decomposed into 5 (the number of ways to climb 4 steps, followed by a single-step) plus 3 (the number of ways to climb 3 steps, followed by a double-step). The same reasoning is applied recursively until a single step, of which there is only one way to climb.

The Fibonacci numbers can be found in different ways among the set of binary strings, or equivalently, among the subsets of a given set.
 The number of binary strings of length  without consecutive s is the Fibonacci number . For example, out of the 16 binary strings of length 4, there are  without consecutive s – they are 0000, 0001, 0010, 0100, 0101, 1000, 1001, and 1010. Such strings are the binary representations of Fibbinary numbers. A bijection with the sums to n+1 is to replace 1 with 0 and 2 with 10, and drop the last zero.
 The number of binary strings of length  without an odd number of consecutive s is the Fibonacci number . For example, out of the 16 binary strings of length 4, there are  without an odd number of consecutive s – they are 0000, 0011, 0110, 1100, 1111. A bijection with the sums to n is to replace 1 with 0 and 2 with 11.
For example, out of the 16 binary strings of length 4, there are  without an even number of consecutive s or s – they are 0001, 0111, 0101, 1000, 1010, 1110. There is an equivalent statement about subsets.
 Yuri Matiyasevich was able to show that the Fibonacci numbers can be defined by a Diophantine equation, which led to his solving Hilbert's tenth problem.
 The Fibonacci numbers are also an example of a complete sequence. This means that every positive integer can be written as a sum of Fibonacci numbers, where any one number is used once at most.
 Moreover, every positive integer can be written in a unique way as the sum of one or more distinct Fibonacci numbers in such a way that the sum does not include any two consecutive Fibonacci numbers. This is known as Zeckendorf's theorem, and a sum of Fibonacci numbers that satisfies these conditions is called a Zeckendorf representation. The Zeckendorf representation of a number can be used to derive its Fibonacci coding.
 Starting with 5, every second Fibonacci number is the length of the hypotenuse of a right triangle with integer sides, or in other words, the largest number in a Pythagorean triple, obtained from the formula  The sequence of Pythagorean triangles obtained from this formula has sides of lengths (3,4,5), (5,12,13), (16,30,34), (39,80,89), ... . The middle side of each of these triangles is the sum of the three sides of the preceding triangle.
 The Fibonacci cube is an undirected graph with a Fibonacci number of nodes that has been proposed as a network topology for parallel computing.
 Fibonacci numbers appear in the ring lemma, used to prove connections between the circle packing theorem and conformal maps.

Computer science 

 The Fibonacci numbers are important in computational run-time analysis of Euclid's algorithm to determine the greatest common divisor of two integers: the worst case input for this algorithm is a pair of consecutive Fibonacci numbers.
 Fibonacci numbers are used in a polyphase version of the merge sort algorithm in which an unsorted list is divided into two lists whose lengths correspond to sequential Fibonacci numbers – by dividing the list so that the two parts have lengths in the approximate proportion φ. A tape-drive implementation of the polyphase merge sort was described in The Art of Computer Programming.
 A Fibonacci tree is a binary tree whose child trees (recursively) differ in height by exactly 1. So it is an AVL tree, and one with the fewest nodes for a given height — the "thinnest" AVL tree. These trees have a number of vertices that is a Fibonacci number minus one, an important fact in the analysis of AVL trees.
 Fibonacci numbers are used by some pseudorandom number generators.
 Fibonacci numbers arise in the analysis of the Fibonacci heap data structure.
 A one-dimensional optimization method, called the Fibonacci search technique, uses Fibonacci numbers.
 The Fibonacci number series is used for optional lossy compression in the IFF 8SVX audio file format used on Amiga computers. The number series compands the original audio wave similar to logarithmic methods such as μ-law.
 Some Agile teams use a modified series called the "Modified Fibonacci Series" in planning poker, as an estimation tool. Planning Poker is a formal part of the Scaled Agile Framework.
 Fibonacci coding
 Negafibonacci coding

Nature 

Fibonacci sequences appear in biological settings, such as branching in trees, arrangement of leaves on a stem, the fruitlets of a pineapple, the flowering of artichoke, an uncurling fern and the arrangement of a pine cone, and the family tree of honeybees. Kepler pointed out the presence of the Fibonacci sequence in nature, using it to explain the (golden ratio-related) pentagonal form of some flowers. Field daisies most often have petals in counts of Fibonacci numbers. In 1830, K. F. Schimper and A. Braun discovered that the parastichies (spiral phyllotaxis) of plants were frequently expressed as fractions involving Fibonacci numbers.

Przemysław Prusinkiewicz advanced the idea that real instances can in part be understood as the expression of certain algebraic constraints on free groups, specifically as certain Lindenmayer grammars.

This has the form

The divergence angle, approximately 137.51°, is the golden angle, dividing the circle in the golden ratio. Because this ratio is irrational, no floret has a neighbor at exactly the same angle from the center, so the florets pack efficiently. Sunflowers and similar flowers most commonly have spirals of florets in clockwise and counter-clockwise directions in the amount of adjacent Fibonacci numbers, typically counted by the outermost range of radii.

Fibonacci numbers also appear in the pedigrees of idealized honeybees, according to the following rules:
 If an egg is laid by an unmated female, it hatches a male or drone bee.
 If, however, an egg was fertilized by a male, it hatches a female.

Thus, a male bee always has one parent, and a female bee has two. If one traces the pedigree of any male bee (1 bee), he has 1 parent (1 bee), 2 grandparents, 3 great-grandparents, 5 great-great-grandparents, and so on. This sequence of numbers of parents is the Fibonacci sequence. This is under the unrealistic assumption that the ancestors at each level are otherwise unrelated.

It has been noticed that the number of possible ancestors on the human X chromosome inheritance line at a given ancestral generation also follows the Fibonacci sequence. A male individual has an X chromosome, which he received from his mother, and a Y chromosome, which he received from his father. The male counts as the "origin" of his own X chromosome, and at his parents' generation, his X chromosome came from a single parent . The male's mother received one X chromosome from her mother (the son's maternal grandmother), and one from her father (the son's maternal grandfather), so two grandparents contributed to the male descendant's X chromosome . The maternal grandfather received his X chromosome from his mother, and the maternal grandmother received X chromosomes from both of her parents, so three great-grandparents contributed to the male descendant's X chromosome . Five great-great-grandparents contributed to the male descendant's X chromosome , etc. (This assumes that all ancestors of a given descendant are independent, but if any genealogy is traced far enough back in time, ancestors begin to appear on multiple lines of the genealogy, until eventually a population founder appears on all lines of the genealogy.)

Other
 In optics, when a beam of light shines at an angle through two stacked transparent plates of different materials of different refractive indexes, it may reflect off three surfaces: the top, middle, and bottom surfaces of the two plates. (However, when , there are three reflection paths, not two, one for each of the three surfaces.)
 Fibonacci retracement levels are widely used in technical analysis for financial market trading.
 Since the conversion factor 1.609344 for miles to kilometers is close to the golden ratio, the decomposition of distance in miles into a sum of Fibonacci numbers becomes nearly the kilometer sum when the Fibonacci numbers are replaced by their successors. This method amounts to a radix 2 number register in golden ratio base φ being shifted. To convert from kilometers to miles, shift the register down the Fibonacci sequence instead.
 The measured values of voltages and currents in the infinite resistor chain circuit (also called the resistor ladder or infinite series-parallel circuit) follow the Fibonacci sequence. The intermediate results of adding the alternating series and parallel resistances yields fractions composed of consecutive Fibonacci numbers. The equivalent resistance of the entire circuit equals the golden ratio.
 Brasch et al. 2012 show how a generalized Fibonacci sequence also can be connected to the field of economics.  In particular, it is shown how a generalized Fibonacci sequence enters the control function of finite-horizon dynamic optimisation problems with one state and one control variable. The procedure is illustrated in an example often referred to as the Brock–Mirman economic growth model.
 Mario Merz included the Fibonacci sequence in some of his artworks beginning in 1970.
 Joseph Schillinger (1895–1943) developed a system of composition which uses Fibonacci intervals in some of its melodies; he viewed these as the musical counterpart to the elaborate harmony evident within nature. See also .

See also

References

Explanatory footnotes

Citations

Works cited
 .
 .
 .
 
 .
 
 .

External links 

 
 Periods of Fibonacci Sequences Mod m at MathPages
 Scientists find clues to the formation of Fibonacci spirals in nature
 
 
 

 
Integer sequences
Articles containing proofs